Bruno Felipe Gomes Gazani (born January 10, 1986) is a Brazilian professional kickboxer. He currently competes in the Lightweight division of GLORY. As of July 31, 2022, he is #9 in the GLORY lightweight rankings.

Kickboxing career

Early years
Gazani fought Wellingtom Tom for the WAKO PRO Brazil -70 kg Title during WGP 22, winning the fight by decision. During WGP 28, Gazani fought a rematch with Ravy Brunow for the WGP Kickboxing -72 kg Title. Brunow won the fight by decision. He fought for the same title again two years later, at WGP 44, against Marcelo Dionísio. He was more successful this time, winning by decision.

At Heat 43, he took part in the HEAT tournament. He defeated Himalayan Cheetah by decision in the semifinal, and Robson Minotinho by decision in the finals. A month later, Gazani defended his WGP title with a decision win against Robson Minotinho. In November 2018, Gazani fought Samo Petje for the FFC Lightweight Kickboxing Title. The fight ended in a draw. Gazani defended the WGP title a further two times, winning decisions against Petros Cabelinho and Damian Segovia.

Glory
He made his Glory debut during Glory 70, against Michael Palandre. Gazani won the fight by split decision.

He was scheduled to fight at Glory 73, against Vlad Tuinov. He won the fight by a third round TKO.

Gazani was scheduled to fight Mohamed Hendouf during Glory 75. He won the fight by split decision.

Gazani was scheduled to face Stoyan Koprivlenski at Glory: Collision 3 on October 23, 2021. He lost the fight by unanimous decision.

Gazani faced Salimkhan Ibragimov at RCC 10 on December 17, 2021. He lost the fight by unanimous decision. Gazani next faced Dragomir Petrov at Senshi 12 on July 9, 2022. He won the fight by unanimous decision.

Gazani was expected to face Nick Chasteen at Glory Rivals 5 on January 28, 2023, in what was his first bout under the Glory promotional banner in over two years. Chasteen withdrew from the fight due to visa issues and was replaced by Magnus Andersson. Gazani lost the fight by split decision.

Championships and awards

Amateur
 2016 WAKO PANAMERICAN Games -70 kg 

Professional 
 World Association of Kickboxing Organizations (WAKO) 
 2019 WAKO Pro Pan American -72 kg Champion 
 WGP Kickboxing
 2018 WGP Kickboxing -72 kg Champion (Three title defenses)
 HEAT
 2018 HEAT -70 kg 4-man Tournament Winner

Kickboxing record

|- style="background:#fbb;"
| 2023-01-28 || Loss ||align=left| Magnus Andersson || Glory Rivals 5 || Tulum, Mexico || Decision (Split) ||  3||3:00
|-
|- style="background:#cfc;"
| 2022-07-09 || Win ||align=left| Dragomir Petrov || Senshi 12 || Varna, Bulgaria || Decision (Unanimous) || 3 || 3:00
|-
|- style="background:#fbb;"
| 2021-12-18 || Loss ||align=left| Salimkhan Ibragimov || RCC 10 || Yekaterinburg, Russia || Decision (Unanimous) || 3 || 3:00
|-
|- style="background:#fbb;"
| 2021-10-23 || Loss ||align=left| Stoyan Koprivlenski || Glory: Collision 3 || Arnhem, Netherlands || Decision (Unanimous) || 3 || 3:00
|-
|- style="background:#cfc;"
|  2020-02-29 || Win || align="left" | Mohamed Hendouf || Glory 75: Utrecht || Utrecht, Netherlands || Decision (Split) || 3 || 3:00
|- style="background:#cfc;"
| 2019-12-07 ||Win|| align="left" | Vlad Tuinov||Glory 73: Shenzen||Shenzen, China||KO (Knee to the body) ||3||0:23
|- style="background:#cfc;"
| 2019-10-26 ||Win|| align="left" | Michael Palandre||Glory 70: Lyon||Lyon, France||Decision (Split)||3||3:00
|- style="background:#cfc;"
| 2019-08-02 ||Win|| align="left" | Damian Segovia || WGP Kickboxing #56 ||Buenos Aires, Argentina||Decision (Split)||5||3:00
|-
! style=background:white colspan=9 |
|- style="background:#cfc;"
| 2019-04-06 ||Win|| align="left" | Petros Cabelinho || WGP Kickboxing #53 ||São Bernardo do Campo, Brazil||Decision||5||3:00
|-
! style=background:white colspan=9 |
|- style="background:#c5d2ea;"
| 2018-11-16 ||Draw|| align="left" | Samo Petje||Final Fight Championship 34||Las Vegas, United States||Decision (Majority)||5 ||3:00
|-
! style=background:white colspan=9 |
|- style="background:#cfc;"
| 2018-10-27 ||Win|| align="left" | Robson Minotinho || WGP Kickboxing #50 ||São Bernardo do Campo, Brazil||Decision||5||3:00
|-
! style=background:white colspan=9 |
|- style="background:#cfc;"
| 2018-09-17 ||Win|| align="left" | Abiral Ghimire || HEAT 43, Final ||Nagoya, Japan||Decision (Unanimous)||3||3:00
|- style="background:#cfc;"
| 2018-09-17 ||Win|| align="left" | David Zurita || HEAT 43, Semi Final ||Nagoya, Japan||KO||1||2:08
|- style="background:#cfc;"
| 2018-02-23 ||Win|| align="left" | Marcelo Dionísio || WGP Kickboxing #44 ||São Bernardo do Campo, Brazil||Decision||5||3:00
|-
! style=background:white colspan=9 |
|- style="background:#cfc;"
| 2017-11-12 ||Win|| align="left" | Anderson Buzika || WGP Kickboxing #42 || Brazil||Decision (Unanimous)||3||3:00
|- style="background:#cfc;"
| 2017-09-16 ||Win|| align="left" | Rafael Teixeira || WGP Kickboxing #40 || Brazil||Decision ||3||3:00
|- style="background:#cfc;"
| 2017-03-04 ||Win|| align="left" | Hao Shengbin || Glory of Heroes 7 || Sao Paulo, Brazil||Decision ||3||3:00
|-  bgcolor= "#CCFFCC"
| 2016-12-02 || Win ||align=left| Iamik Furtado || WGP Kickboxing 35 || Brazil ||Decision (Unanimous)|| 3 || 3:00
|-  bgcolor= "#CCFFCC"
| 2016–08-20 || Win ||align=left| Max Koubik || Road to Glory Brazil Tournament, Final || Brazil ||Decision (Unanimous)|| 3 || 3:00
|-
! style=background:white colspan=9 |
|-  bgcolor= "#CCFFCC"
| 2016–08-20 || Win ||align=left| Vitor Formigão || Road to Glory Brazil Tournament, Semi Final || Brazil ||Decision || 3 || 3:00
|-  bgcolor= "#CCFFCC"
| 2016–08-20 || Win ||align=left|  João Victor || Road to Glory Brazil Tournament, Quarter Final || Brazil ||KO  (Left Knee to the Body)|| 1 ||
|- style="background:#FFBBBB;"
| 2016-07-16 ||Loss|| align="left" | Ravy Brunow || WGP Kickboxing #32 ||Brazil||Decision (Unanimous)||5||3:00
|-
! style=background:white colspan=9 |
|-  bgcolor= "#CCFFCC"
| 2016-05-08 || Win ||align=left| Emanuel Ramponi || WGP Kickboxing 30 || Brazil ||KO (Flying Knee)|| 3 || 1:45
|- style="background:#FFBBBB;"
| 2015-12-19 ||Loss|| align="left" | Ravy Brunow || WGP Kickboxing #28 ||Brazil||Decision ||5||3:00
|-
! style=background:white colspan=9 |
|-  style="background:#fbb;"
| 2015-11-07|| Loss||align=left| Carlos Roberto Formiga || XI Desafio de Muay Thai  || Brazil || Decision || 5 || 3:00
|- style="background:#cfc;"
| 2015-07-25 ||Win|| align="left" | Wallace Lopes || WGP Kickboxing #25 || Brazil||TKO (Corner Stoppage)||2||3:00
|- style="background:#cfc;"
| 2014-09-27 ||Win|| align="left" | Wellingtom Tom || WGP Kickboxing #22 ||São Paulo, Brazil||Decision||5||3:00
|-
! style=background:white colspan=9 |
|- style="background:#cfc;"
| 2014-05-17 ||Win|| align="left" | Janio Mancha  || WGP Kickboxing #20, Final || Brazil||Decision||3||3:00
|- style="background:#cfc;"
| 2014-05-17 ||Win|| align="left" | Maycon Oller   || WGP Kickboxing #20, Semi Final || Brazil||Decision||3||3:00
|- style="background:#cfc;"
| 2013-12-21 ||Win|| align="left" | Anderson Buzika || WGP Kickboxing #17 || Brazil||Decision||3||3:00
|- style="background:#cfc;"
| 2013-11-09 ||Win|| align="left" | Daniel Nery || WGP Kickboxing #16 ||São Paulo, Brazil||KO (Punches)||2||1:30
|- style="background:#fbb;"
| 2013-06-22 ||Loss|| align="left" | Ravy Brunow || IX DESAFIO MUAYTHAI ||Brazil||Decision ||5||3:00
|- style="background:#cfc;"
| 2013-04 ||Win|| align="left" | Alex Oller ||  || Brazil||Decision ||3||3:00
|-  style="background:#FFBBBB;"
| 2013-02-23 || Win ||align=left| Enriko Gogokhia || Tatneft Arena World Cup 2013 4th selection 1/8 final (-70 kg) || Kazan, Russia || Decision (Unanimous) || 4 ||3:00
|- style="background:#cfc;"
| 2012-12-08 ||Win|| align="left" | Carlos Formiga || Tatneft Cup Brazil, Final || Brazil||Decision ||4||3:00
|-
! style=background:white colspan=9 |
|- style="background:#cfc;"
| 2012-12-08 ||Win|| align="left" | Renan Mazza || Tatneft Cup Brazil, Semi Final || Brazil||Decision ||4||3:00
|- style="background:#cfc;"
| 2012-12-08 ||Win|| align="left" |  || Tatneft Cup Brazil, Quarter Final || Brazil||||||
|- style="background:#cfc;"
| 2012-08-04 ||Win|| align="left" | Junior Pinico || Mr Fight II || Brazil||KO (Knees)||||
|- style="background:#FFBBBB;"
| 2012 ||Loss|| align="left" | Milton Matos||  || Brazil||Decision ||3||3:00
|- style="background:#cfc;"
| 2012 ||Win|| align="left" | Elder Allan ||  || Brazil||Decision ||5||3:00
|-
| colspan=9 | Legend:    

|-  style="background:#FFBBBB;"
| 2017-10-26|| Loss||align=left| Bogdan Shumarov || IWGA WORLD GAMES 2017 || Poland ||  Decision || 3||2:00
|-  style="background:#CCFFCC;"
| 2016-10-26|| Win||align=left| || WAKO PANAMERICAN Championship, Final || Mexico ||  || ||
|-
! style=background:white colspan=9 |
|-  style="background:#CCFFCC;"
| 2016-10-26|| Win||align=left| || WAKO PANAMERICAN Championship, Semi Final || Mexico ||  || ||
|-  style="background:#CCFFCC;"
| 2016-10-26|| Win||align=left| || WAKO PANAMERICAN Championship, Quarter Final || Mexico ||  || ||
|-
| colspan=9 | Legend:

See also
List of male kickboxers

References

External links
 Official Glory profile

1986 births
Living people
Brazilian male kickboxers
Lightweight kickboxers
Glory kickboxers
Competitors at the 2017 World Games
Sportspeople from São Paulo (state)